The sixth season of the American ABC fantasy-drama series Once Upon a Time was ordered on March 3, 2016. It debuted on September 25, 2016, and concluded on May 14, 2017. In January 2017, it was stated that the sixth season would end the main storyline, and for a seventh season, the series would be softly rebooted with a new storyline.

Existing fictional characters introduced to the series during the season include Aladdin, Princess Jasmine, the Count of Monte Cristo, Captain Nemo, Lady Tremaine, Beowulf, Tiger Lily and the Tin Man. The season also reintroduced Jafar and Dr. Arthur Lydgate, both of whom previously appeared in Once Upon a Time in Wonderland.

This season marks the final appearance of original cast members Ginnifer Goodwin, Jennifer Morrison, Josh Dallas and Jared S. Gilmore as well as long-time cast members Emilie de Ravin and Rebecca Mader as series regulars. All would make at least one appearance the following season.

Premise
The residents of Storybrooke are faced with threats from the Evil Queen and Mr. Hyde, both with different agendas following the arrival of refugees from the Land of Untold Stories. It leads to events testing Emma's savior abilities that result in the arrival of the Black Fairy, thus beginning the final battle that is prophesied before the casting of the original Dark Curse. As dark and light collide, a new, and darker curse is unleashed, leading to the fall of all the realms of story. The final battle is fought and won, leading to the heroes earning their happy beginnings. In the far future, a new adventure begins for an adult Henry and his daughter Lucy.

Cast and characters

Regular
 Ginnifer Goodwin as Snow White / Mary Margaret Blanchard
 Jennifer Morrison as Emma Swan
 Lana Parrilla as Evil Queen / Regina Mills
 Josh Dallas as Prince Charming / David Nolan
 Emilie de Ravin as Belle French
 Colin O'Donoghue as Captain Hook / Killian Jones
 Jared S. Gilmore as Henry Mills
 Rebecca Mader as Wicked Witch of the West / Zelena
 Robert Carlyle as Rumplestiltskin / Mr. Gold

Recurring

 Beverley Elliott as Widow Lucas / Granny
 Raphael Sbarge as Jiminy Cricket / Dr. Archie Hopper
 Lee Arenberg as Dreamy / Grumpy / Leroy
 David Paul Grove as Doc
 Gabe Khouth as Sneezy / Mr. Clark
 Faustino Di Bauda as Sleepy / Walter
 Mig Macario as Bashful
 Geoff Gustafson as Stealthy
 Tony Amendola as Mister Geppetto / Marco
 Keegan Connor Tracy as the Blue Fairy / Mother Superior
 Eion Bailey as Pinocchio / August Booth
 David Anders as Victor Frankenstein / Dr. Whale
 Jessy Schram as Cinderella / Ashley Boyd
 Tim Phillipps as Prince Thomas / Sean Herman
 Gabrielle Rose as Ruth
 Alan Dale as King George / Albert Spencer
 Jaime Murray as Fiona / the Black Fairy
 Giles Matthey as Gideon / Morpheus
 Sean Maguire as Robin Hood
 Tony Perez as Prince Henry
 Rose McIver as Tinker Bell
 JoAnna Garcia as Ariel
 Gil McKinney as Prince Eric
 Giancarlo Esposito as Magic Mirror / Sidney Glass
 Chris Gauthier as Mr. Smee
 Hank Harris as Dr. Henry Jekyll
 Sam Witwer as Mr. Hyde
 Deniz Akdeniz as Aladdin
 Karen David as Jasmine
 Olivia Steele Falconer as Violet
 Tzi Ma as the Dragon
 Patrick Fischler as Isaac Heller
 Sara Tomko as Tiger Lily
 Wil Traval as the Sheriff of Nottingham / Keith

Guest

 Oded Fehr as Jafar
 Tarun Keram as Emir
 Jordyn Ashley Olson as the Oracle
 Craig Horner as Edmond Dantès / Count of Monte Cristo
 Andrea Brooks as Charlotte
 Andrew Kavadas as Baron Danglars
 Lisa Banes as Lady Tremaine
 Mekenna Melvin as Clorinda Tremaine
 Goldie Hoffman as Tisbe Tremaine
 Max Lloyd-Jones as Jacob
 Jarod Joseph as Gus / Billy
 Jonny Coyne as Dr. Arthur Lydgate
 Elizabeth Blackmore as Mary Lydgate
 Reilly Jacob as Tom Sawyer
 Cedric De Souza as the Sultan
 Kate Dion-Richard as Goldilocks
 Faran Tahir as Captain Nemo
 Nick Eversman as First Mate Liam Jones II
 Paul Johansson as Gabriel / the Woodcutter
 Nick Hunnings as Jack
 Tammy Gillis as Jill
 Mckenna Grace as young Emma
 Rustin Gresiuk as teen August / Pinocchio
 Jack Davies as young Pinocchio
 David Cubitt as Robert
 Tara Wilson as young Ruth
 Luke Roessler as young David / young James
 Brandon Spink as young Baelfire
 Torstein Bjørklund as Beowulf
 Zahf Paroo as Prince Achmed
 Charles Mesure as Blackbeard
 Anton Starkman as young Gideon
 Grayson Gabriel as Roderick
 Mason McKenzie as young Roderick
 Isabella Blake-Thomas as young Zelena
 Alex Désert as Stanum / Tin Man
 Austin Obiajunwa as young Stanum
 Stephen Lord as Malcolm 
 Andrew J. West as adult Henry Mills
 Alison Fernandez as Lucy

Episodes

Production

Development
Executive producers Adam Horowitz and Edward Kitsis announced that they were ending the half-season arc structure that was seen in seasons three through five, with Horowitz saying, "We’re also planning a 22-episode story as opposed to breaking it up into two halves this year. It has been really exciting and fun." Kitsis added: "We are changing around what we’re doing this year and going back to that season 1 mentality of small town stories and smaller arcs." This season would focus on Storybrooke as the main setting, but would also show new realms and an exploration of the Savior's mythology. Kitsis and Horowitz hired two directors from their Freeform series Dead of Summer, Norman Buckley and Mairzee Almas, alongside Michael Schultz, to helm several episodes of the season. Jennifer Lynch directed the eighth episode of the season, "I'll Be Your Mirror".

In January 2017, ABC president Channing Dungey had been the first to suggest that the current narrative of the show would end with season six, regardless of whether or not there is a season seven. Shortly after this news, Jennifer Morrison revealed that the contracts for the original main cast members were expiring in April, expressing uncertainty about the future of the show and her participation in it beyond the current season. Robert Carlyle also expressed that he'd have to make a decision about his future on the show by the end of that month. In March 2017, several sources had reported that four of the current main cast members in particular - Morrison, Carlyle, Lana Parrilla, and Colin O'Donoghue - were in negotiations to renew their contracts for a potential seventh season. In April 2017, Horowitz and Kitsis confirmed that a group of characters will indeed have their stories wrapped up by the end of the season in acknowledging the potential cast changes, saying: "We planned this finale from the beginning of the year, so whoever stays and whoever goes... all those questions have already been dealt with. The audience does not have to fear [anything feeling] incomplete." On May 8, Morrison confirmed that she had declined an offer to remain on the show and that the sixth season would be her last, signaling the end of Emma Swan's time on the show as the main protagonist. On May 11, Rebecca Mader announced that she would also be leaving the show at the end of the season, citing creative decisions beyond her control. On May 12, season six was announced to be the last for four additional main actors: Ginnifer Goodwin, Josh Dallas, Jared Gilmore, and Emilie de Ravin. The season finale revealed that Henry Mills would remain a series protagonist, with the setting shifting to a later time period in which he is portrayed as an adult by Andrew J. West.

Musical episode

In January 2017, TVLine reported that the series would feature a musical episode later in the season. Creators Kitsis and Horowitz had spoken about the desire to do a musical installment previously, but didn't "even know where to begin." Kitsis and Horowitz confirmed the report in February. They had also since confirmed that the episode would feature seven original songs, including solos by Jennifer Morrison and Rebecca Mader, as well as a "sing-off" musical number featuring the Evil Queen and the Charmings. Composers Alan Zachary and Michael Weiner were brought in to write the original numbers featured, with arrangements provided by the series' long-time composer Mark Isham. Kitsis and Hororwitz spoke about the nature of the episode saying, "It actually is a huge part of the mythology of the show and there are some big things that happen in the episode, frankly, it's been one of the challenges of doing the musical because we never wanted to do something where it was just like a to-the-side, one-off thing, and then get back to the main story. We want to see it part of the main story, which meant we had to really plan out this season with some great detail."

Casting

Emilie de Ravin told fans that she would be returning for the sixth season. It was also announced later that Hank Harris and Sam Witwer signed contracts to play two new recurring characters on the sixth season of the show, later revealed to be Dr. Jekyll and Mr. Hyde respectively. On March 29, 2016, Lana Parrilla confirmed that she would be returning for the sixth season. Robert Carlyle was confirmed to be returning for the sixth season as Rumplestiltskin along with Rebecca Mader as Zelena and Jared Gilmore as Henry Mills.

It was announced that Giles Matthey was cast as Morpheus, who was slated to appear in the first episode of the season. On July 20, it was announced that Craig Horner would be portraying the Count of Monte Cristo, who was introduced in the second episode of the season. At the 2016 San Diego Comic-Con, it was revealed that the season would see the introduction of Aladdin, played by Deniz Akdeniz, and his story would feature the return of Jafar, now portrayed by Oded Fehr. The character had previously been featured on Once Upon a Time in Wonderland, portrayed by Naveen Andrews, who was unavailable for this season due to his commitment to Netflixs Sense8. It was also announced that Galavants Karen David was cast as Princess Jasmine. David made her debut in the fourth episode of the season.

In early July, it was announced that Raphael Sbarge would be returning as Jiminy Cricket / Dr. Archie Hopper for the season, having last appearanced in the season 4 episode "Rocky Road". On July 20, it was announced that Jessy Schram would be reprising her role as Cinderella in the third episode of the season. The episode explored a connection that her character has to someone from the Land of Untold Stories, as well as the start of her friendship with Snow White. That same episode also introduced Cinderella's stepmother and stepsisters. David Anders returned for an episode as Victor Frankenstein, connecting the character with Jekyll and Hyde. On August 15, it was announced that Jonny Coyne would be reprising his role as Dr. Lydgate from Once Upon a Time in Wonderland, in the fourth episode of the season. On August 26, it was announced that Faran Tahir was cast as Captain Nemo, and would have ties to Captain Hook. On September 22, it was announced that Tzi Ma would be reprising his role as the Dragon in the season. Gabrielle Rose would also be returning as David's mother, Ruth, who appeared via flashback in episode 7. On September 27, it was announced that Sean Maguire would be returning as Robin Hood. The former main character, who died near the end of season 5, would not be resurrected, but would appear in a multi-episode arc in a different capacity. 

For the second half of the season, Wil Traval returned for multiple episodes, starting in episode 11, as the Sheriff of Nottingham. On October 31, it was announced that Mckenna Grace would be returning as a younger version of Emma. On December 11, Robert Carlyle revealed that Brandon Spink would be portraying a young Baelfire in episode 13. On January 6, 2017, it was announced that JoAnna Garcia would be returning as Ariel. The storyline involves a team-up between Ariel, Jasmine, and Hook. On January 7, Horowitz confirmed that Gil McKinney would also be returning as Prince Eric. Two days later, it was announced that Rose McIver would also be coming back as Tinker Bell. On January 20, it was revealed that Sara Tomko was cast as Tiger Lily. The recurring character appears in at least two episodes starting in episode 17. On January 23, Horowitz announced that Patrick Fischler would return as Isaac Heller at some point in the second half of the season, having last appeared in the fourth season finale "Operation Mongoose". On March 14, it was announced that episode 18 would introduce the Tin Man, played by Alex Désert, and the Cowardly Lion from the Wizard of Oz tale.

On February 16, TVLine released casting call descriptions for two characters who appear in the season 6 finale, with potential to continue into season 7 if the show is to be renewed. One is a man in his late 20s-early 30s who "was once optimistic and hopeful but now is a friendless, cynical recluse" but "still possesses a dormant, deep-seated spark of hope that waits for the right person to reignite it." The other is a 10-year-old girl who "comes from a broken home" but "those struggles have only made her stronger — something which will come in handy when darkness threatens everything she holds dear." On March 8, it was announced that Andrew J. West had been cast in the unidentified male role, later revealed in the finale as an adult Henry Mills. On March 9, it was announced that Alison Fernandez had been cast in the unidentified female role, also later revealed in the finale to be Henry's daughter Lucy.

On May 8, 2017, Jennifer Morrison announced that she had declined an offer to remain on the show through season 7 and would not be returning as a series regular in the event the series was renewed by ABC. However, Morrison noted that she had signed a contract to appear in at least one episode in season 7.

On May 12, 2017, showrunners Horowitz and Kitsis confirmed that five more cast members, in addition to Morrison, would not be returning to the show as regulars for a seventh season: Ginnifer Goodwin, Josh Dallas, Jared Gilmore, Emilie de Ravin, and Rebecca Mader. In their personal goodbyes to fans, both de Ravin and Mader cited the show's decision to move forward in a new creative direction as the reason for their departures. Gilmore expressed similar sentiments. Meanwhile, Goodwin and Dallas had informed the showrunners a year prior that they intended to leave the show at the end of the sixth season.

Ratings

References

External links
 

2016 American television seasons
2017 American television seasons
Season 6